Blyborough is a village and civil parish in the West Lindsey district of Lincolnshire, England. The population of the civil parish at the 2011 census was 115.

Blyborough's Grade I listed Anglican parish church is dedicated to the Anglo-Saxon saint and martyr, Alkmund of Derby. Built in the early 13th century, it was partially rebuilt in 1877 by James Fowler.

Two Grade II listed village buildings are Blyborough Grange Farmhouse and Blyborough Hall. The hall was built in the early 18th century and was for many generations the home of the Luard family, who acquired their wealth through sugar plantations in the West Indies.

References

External links

"Blyborough", Genuki.org.uk. Retrieved 29 June 2011

Villages in Lincolnshire
Civil parishes in Lincolnshire
Grade I listed buildings in Lincolnshire
West Lindsey District